WCPR (1450 AM) is a radio station broadcasting a Spanish variety format. It is licensed to Coamo, Puerto Rico, and is owned by the Soler Prieto Family, under its licensee, Coamo Broadcasting Corporation.

References

External links

CPRar
Radio stations established in 1967
Coamo, Puerto Rico
1967 establishments in Puerto Rico